Paul Byrne (born 19 May 1986, in Dublin), is an Irish footballer who last played as a forward for League of Ireland Premier Division club Shelbourne.

Career

UCD
Byrne began his League of Ireland career with UCD on a sports scholarship in 2004 following his spell in schoolboy football with Cherry Orchard. After making an impressive impact with UCD's Under 21 side, Byrne was promoted to UCD's first team towards the end of their 2004 First Division campaign where he scored 3 goals in 4 appearances helping UCD to promotion. A series of injuries restricted Byrne to limited appearances for UCD over the 2005 and 2006 seasons but an injury-free run in 2007 saw Byrne score 7 goals in all competitions for the Students. In his spell with UCD, Byrne was one of a select few who won the Under-21 league championship on three occasions in 2004, 2005 and 2007.

Sporting Fingal/Bray Wanderers
Byrne departed UCD mid-way through the 2008 season to join First Division side Sporting Fingal. Byrne made 16 appearances in all competitions scoring 2 goals helping Fingal to 3rd place finish in their inaugural season of League of Ireland football. As Sporting Fingal moved in a direction to full-time football, Byrne parted company with the club and he returned to the Premier Division in 2009 with Bray Wanderers. Despite a frustrating season in front of goal with just 3 goals, Byrne remained an ever present figure in the Seagulls starting XI making 28 appearances in all competitions. Bray were relegated from the Premier Division following a promotion/relegation play-off defeat to his most recent club Sporting Fingal.

St. Patrick's Athletic/Monagahan United
Byrne followed his former UCD manager Pete Mahon to St. Patrick's Athletic for 2010 Premier Division season. A number of impressive displays saw Byrne help St. Pats' to a title challenge and a Setanta Sports Cup final before injury limited his appearances in the 2nd half of the season. Byrne departed St. Patrick's Athletic at the end of the 2010 season to relocate to Australia. In Australia he linked up with former League of Ireland Player Brian Shelley at Victoria club Ballarat Red Devils. Byrne decided to return to Ireland mid-season and joined up with First Division title challengers Monaghan United. He was restricted to substitute appearances as Monaghan secured promotion back to the Premier Division.

Shelbourne
Byrne joined newly promoted Premier Division club Shelbourne on 9 February 2012 for the 2012 campaign.

Career statistics

Correct as of 10 October 2012.

Competitions include Setanta Sports Cup, League of Ireland promotion/relegation play-offs and Leinster Senior Cup

Honours
UCD
League of Ireland Under 21 League (1): 2004, 2005, 2007

References

External links
Paul Byrne's profile at www.shelbournefc.com

1986 births
Living people
Association footballers from Dublin (city)
Association football forwards
League of Ireland players
University College Dublin A.F.C. players
Sporting Fingal F.C. players
Bray Wanderers F.C. players
St Patrick's Athletic F.C. players
Ballarat City FC players
Monaghan United F.C. players
Shelbourne F.C. players
Republic of Ireland association footballers
Cherry Orchard F.C. players